(S)-UH-301 is a drug and research chemical widely used in scientific studies. It acts as a selective 5-HT1A receptor silent antagonist. It is structurally related to 8-OH-DPAT. UH-301 was found to produce a head-twitch response in mice which is usually typical of 5-HT2A agonist drugs, and has subsequently been used to investigate how 5-HT1A receptor activity modulates 5-HT2A receptors downstream.

See also
 4-HO-DPT
 Robalzotan
 UH-232

References 

5-HT1A antagonists
Phenols
Fluoroarenes
Aminotetralins